HSBC Bank Argentina S.A. is the principal HSBC operating company in Argentina. The seventh-largest bank in the country, it provides a full range of banking and financial products and services, including commercial, consumer and corporate banking, to over 1.2 million customers.

Operations

HSBC Argentina is one of the largest financial organizations in Argentina and comprises HSBC Bank Argentina, HSBC MAXIMA AFJP, HSBC La Buenos Aires and HSBC New York Life. Proa is a local consumer finance company set up to draw on the experience and knowledge of HSBC Finance Corporation. The group's product and service distribution network includes 139 retail bank branches nationwide, as well as financial and pension fund offices. HSBC Argentina maintains deposits of around US$3 billion, and a lending portfolio of nearly US$2 billion (both around 4% of the domestic market).

History

Midland Bank purchased a stake in Banco Roberts, a subsidiary established in 1903 by the historic Anglo-South American Bank, in 1987. HSBC Group acquired Midland in 1992. In 1997, the Group acquired the remaining shares in the Roberts Group holding company and renamed it HSBC Argentina Holdings SA. 

In 2006, HSBC announced that it had signed an agreement with Banca Nazionale del Lavoro SpA to acquire the latter's banking operations in Argentina, Banca Nazionale del Lavoro S.A. (BNL), for US$155 million. BNL had started operating in Argentina in 1960 and had 91 branches in 18 provinces, 700,000 active personal customers and 26,700 commercial customers when the HSBC takeover was completed on 28 April 2006. HSBC rebranded the Argentine operations of BNL as "BNL en Argentina es HSBC" (BNL in Argentina is HSBC), and for two years, maintained the link to BNL, mainly for the community of 70,000 Italian Argentines receiving pensions from Italy.

Simon Martin, President of HSBC Argentina, was appointed head of the mother company's group sustainability and corporate responsibility office in 2007.
 
The group, headquartered since 1996 in a modern, Avenida de Mayo high-rise, relocated in 2009 to the historic, former Banco Popular Argentino headquarters. The Plateresque building, designed by Antonio and Carlos Vilar, was completed in 1931. Located on Florida Street, it became property of Banco Roberts upon the latter's acquisition of the Banco Popular in 1996, and was transferred to HSBC Argentina upon Roberts' merger the following year.

December 20, 2001, incident
On December 20, 2001, at the height of the December 2001 riots in Argentina,  HSBC security personnel opened fire from inside the HSBC Buenos Aires headquarters building against civilians that had been marching to Plaza de Mayo to demonstrate against President Fernando de la Rúa who resigned a day later. Gustavo Ariel Benedetto was murdered by a 9 mm gunshot to his head in this episode. HSBC's security video recordings demonstrated later that security personnel actually opened fire while not being at any substantial risk since marchers were not able to enter the building.

See also 

HSBC Holdings plc

References

External links 
 HSBC Bank Argentina

Banks of Argentina
Banks established in 1903
Argentina
Commercial buildings completed in 1931
Buildings and structures in Buenos Aires
1903 establishments in Argentina
Argentine subsidiaries of foreign companies